Ponjevići is a village in the municipality of the Hercegovine region of Bosnia and Herzegovina.

Demographics 
According to the 2013 census, its population was 457.

References

Populated places in Cazin